The Smoke, also known as Two Days in the Smoke (worldwide title outside UK/Ireland: London Payback), is a British crime thriller film starring Matt Di Angelo, Lili Bordán, Stephen Marcus, Lindsay Armaou, Anna Passey and Alan Ford.

Plot
Lawyer Brad Walker (Matt Di Angelo) is having a bad day. His girlfriend Sasha (Anna Passey) has left him for a mate of his. And he's lost his job. While drowning his sorrows, Brad overhears a conversation between two drug dealers. In a moment of madness, Brad decides to steal thousands of pounds from their boss Jack (Alan Ford), an intimidating gangster who will stop at nothing to get his money back and exact retribution on the one who took it.

Cast
Matt Di Angelo ... Brad
Lili Bordán ... Jodie
Alan Ford ... Jack
Lindsay Armaou ... Georgina
Stephen Marcus ... Ben
Darren Ripley ... Phil
Velibor Topic ... Dmitri
Christian Brassington ... Tom
Anna Passey ... Sasha
Jeff Leach ... Dean
Funda Önal ... Sister Josephine
George Weightman ... Kingo
Martin Richardson ... Greg
Duncan Casey ... Raef
Ricky Groves ... Sweeney
Frazer Hines ... Mr. Hemmings
Ayden Callaghan ... Liam
Jamila Jennings-Grant ... Lucy
Clark Vasey ... Warren

Production

In April 2012, Screen Daily announced Matt Di Angelo, Alan Ford and Stephen Marcus had all signed on to appear in the film under its shooting title Two Days in the Smoke.

Sections of the film were filmed at Tower Bridge, Covent Garden, St Pancras railway station, RAF Uxbridge, the Apex London Wall Hotel and Apex City of London Hotel, and the Pont Alexandre III bridge over the River Seine in Paris, France.

The budget for the film was over £500,000 and the film was the first to be funded using the UK Government's Seed Enterprise Investment Scheme, launched while the film was mid-production.

The soundtrack features songs from Grammy-nominated En Vogue, Some Velvet Morning and an end title song by Lindsay Armaou (of Irish girlband B*Witched, who also stars in the film).

The film was picked up at Cannes in 2014 by UK distributor Signature Entertainment and renamed The Smoke. Their linear studio cut of the film was released in the UK on 20 October 2014.  The film was released in the US and other countries as London Payback.

The non-linear Director's cut, featuring 12 additional minutes of unseen footage including an opening monologue and the last known screen appearance of the late British actor Malcolm Tierney (best known for his roles in Star Wars and Braveheart, who died before the film was completed), is as yet unreleased.

References

External links

Two Days in the Smoke at Slate 4 Films

2014 films
British crime thriller films
Films shot in England
Films shot in London
2010s English-language films
2010s British films